Tiffin is a city in and the county seat of Seneca County, Ohio, United States. Developed along the Sandusky River, which flows to Lake Erie, Tiffin is about 55 miles southeast of Toledo. The population was 17,963 at the 2010 census. The National Arbor Day Foundation has designated Tiffin as a Tree City USA.

It is the home of Heidelberg University and Tiffin University. At one time the city was noted as a glass and porcelain manufacturing center. Tiffin has several public elementary schools, Tiffin Middle School, Columbian High School. In addition, Calvert Catholic Schools form a parochial system.

History
The European-American settled history of Tiffin dates back to 1812. The familiar bronze statue of "The Indian Maiden" on Frost Parkway, near Miami Street, marks the site of Fort Ball, a military depot of the War of 1812. During a fighting engagement of that war, Erastus Bowe sighted the location where Tiffin later developed. In 1817, he returned to the site and built his Pan Yan Tavern, on the North Sandusky River. Its name was likely derived from Penn Yan, New York, the seat of Yates County in the Finger Lakes region and the origin for numerous migrants to Ohio.

Early homesteaders followed soon after Bowe, and the settlement of Oakley sprang up around the Pan Yan on the north side of the river. The chief road of the area followed the path of the stagecoaches through Oakley, which was called Fort Ball after 1824.

In 1821, Josiah Hedges purchased a piece of land on the south bank of the river opposite Oakley and founded another settlement. He named this village "Tiffin" in honor of Edward Tiffin, first governor of Ohio and later a member of the United States Senate. He had helped gain statehood for the Ohio Territory in 1803. Tiffin was incorporated by an act of the Ohio Legislature on March 7, 1835. These two communities, split by the Sandusky River, were rivals. In 1850, seeing that their interests lay together, the villages merged to form Tiffin, with Fort Ball becoming a part of Tiffin in March of that year.

In 1824, with the establishment of Seneca County by the Ohio Legislature, Tiffin was designated as the county seat. The county was named after the Seneca Indians, the westernmost of the Iroquois League of Six Nations, who dominated this territory for centuries. They were based in New York, from the Hudson River west along the southern edge of the Great Lakes into Pennsylvania. They had conquered the Ohio Valley during the Beaver Wars and preserved it as hunting grounds.

The discovery of natural gas in the vicinity in 1888 gave new momentum to the city's industrial development. New enterprises located in Tiffin, making it a prosperous industrial city:
The National Machinery Company moved from Cleveland to Tiffin in 1882.
Webster Industries, Inc. moved from Chicago to Tiffin in 1906.
Tiffin Glass Works operated here from 1889 to 1980.
American Standard Companies (formerly Great Western Pottery), maker of ceramic kitchen and bath products, operated here from 1899 to 2007. It was the largest employer in the city.
Clifford O. Hanson founded The Hanson Clutch and Machinery Company in Tiffin. It was acquired by Pettibone in 1966. Pettibone LLC, which today is an affiliate of The Heico Companies, renamed the business unit Tiffin Parts in 1997. Operating at the same site since the 1920s, the building on Miami Street is on the National Register of Historic Places.

In the spring of 1913, the Upper Mississippi and Ohio River valleys were ravaged by one of the most devastating floods in the region's history. Among those communities which suffered the consequences of that flood was Tiffin, located on the Sandusky River in northwest Ohio. During that three-day period, Tiffin sustained more than $1,000,000 in property loss, 46 houses and 2 factories swept away, 10 factories damaged, 69 places of business heavily damaged, 6 bridges within the corporate limits destroyed, and 19 people died.

Ballreich's Bros., a potato chip company, has operated in Tiffin since 1920. While the company's retail market is Northern Ohio, its products have a reputation that extends beyond its local retail market; these are available for shipping anywhere via the company's website. The company was acquired by a group of local investors in 2019.

Tiffin St. Paul's United Methodist Church was the first church in the world to be lit by Edison's light bulb, and the first public building in the United States to be wired for electricity.

Tiffin is home to a large population of German-Americans, descendants of immigrants largely from the mid-19th century. In 1970 Tiffin's peak population was 21,896. Since the late 1970s and industrial restructuring, the city has lost industry, jobs and population. Many jobs have moved offshore.

Tiffin is the home of the historic Ritz Theatre, built in 1928 as a vaudeville house; it is in the Italian Renaissance style. The Ritz Theatre received extensive renovation and restoration in 1998.

In 2002, an F3 tornado hit southeast Tiffin, destroying several homes outside city limits.

A new Mercy Hospital of Tiffin was built and opened in July 2008.

In 2022, Tiffin City Council elected the city's first female mayor, Dawn Iannantuono. Iannantuono is the 50th mayor of the City of Tiffin.

Geography
The Sandusky River flows through the center of the city. It is located on U.S. Route 224.

Climate

Demographics

2020 census
As of the census of 2020, there were 17,953 people and 7,111 households residing in the city. The racial makeup of the city was 88.3% White, 4.3% African American, 0.5% Native American, 1.7% Asian, 0.7% from other races, and 2.2% from two or more races. Hispanic or Latino of any race were 3.3% of the population.

4.3% of residents were under the age of 5, 17.9% were under the age of 18, and 19.1% were 65 or older. The gender makeup of the city was 48.7% male and 51.3% female.

2010 census
As of the census of 2010, there were 17,963 people, 7,086 households, and 4,115 families residing in the city. The racial makeup of the city was 93.9% White, 2.6% African American, 0.2% Native American, 1.0% Asian, 0.7% from other races, and 1.6% from two or more races. Hispanic or Latino of any race were 3.1% of the population.

There were 7,086 households, of which 27.4% had children under the age of 18 living with them, 41.0% were married couples living together, 12.2% had a female householder with no husband present, 4.9% had a male householder with no wife present, and 41.9% were non-families. 34.3% of all households were made up of individuals, and 15.4% had someone living alone who was 65 years of age or older. The average household size was 2.29 and the average family size was 2.91.

The median age in the city was 35.2 years. 20.7% of residents were under the age of 18; 17.4% were between the ages of 18 and 24; 21.5% were from 25 to 44; 24.6% were from 45 to 64; and 15.8% were 65 years of age or older. The gender makeup of the city was 48.9% male and 51.1% female.

2000 census
As of the census of 2000, there were 18,135 people, 11,330 households, and 9,471 families residing in the city. The population density was (10,792.4/mi) people per square mile (11,078.9/km). There were 17,862 housing units at an average density of 11,210.6 per square mile (467.7/km). The racial makeup of the city was 96.3% White, 1.5% African American, 0.2% Native American, 0.5% Asian, 0.0% Pacific Islander, 0.6% from other races, and 1.00% from two or more races. Hispanic or Latino of any race were 2.1% of the population.

There were 11,330 households, out of which 32.4% had children under the age of 18 living with them, 46.2% were married couples living together, 11.1% had a female householder with no husband present, and 39.0% were non-families. 32.6% of all households were made up of individuals, and 14.0% had someone living alone who was 65 years of age or older. The average household size was 2.31 and the average family size was 2.92.

In the city the population was spread out, with 22.3% under the age of 18, 15.1% from 18 to 24, 25.9% from 25 to 44, 20.9% from 45 to 64, and 15.8% who were 65 years of age or older. The median age was 36 years. For every 100 females, there were 95.7 males. For every 100 females age 18 and over, there were 92.6 males.

The median income for a household in the city was $33,261, and the median income for a family was $41,329. Males had a median income of $31,207 versus $22,259 for females. The per capita income for the city was $16,580. About 5.7% of families and about 11.1% of the population were below the poverty line, including 9.4% of those under age 18 and 8.9% of those age 65 or over.

Sports
The Tiffin Saints were part of the Independent Baseball League that played an abbreviated single season at the Heidelberg University baseball field in 2014. The Saints were Tiffin's first "professional" baseball team since the Tiffin Mud Hens played in the Ohio State League from 1936 to 1941. The Tiffin Mud Hens won the OSL championship in 1936.

The Saints and IBL, which initially began with six teams, folded before the end of the inaugural season due to financial woes and controversy over whether or not the players were paid. The Adrian Pioneers beat the Ohio Travelers to win the shortened IBL season.

Tiffin is also home to the Tiffin Cross Country Carnival, a large-scale high school cross country meet.

Education
Tiffin is served by Tiffin City Schools:  Columbian High School, Tiffin Middle School, and C.A. Krout, Noble, and Washington elementary schools.

Tiffin is also served by the Calvert Catholic Schools:  Calvert High School for grades 7-12, and one campus school, Calvert Elementary, for preschool through grade 6.

Other schools in Tiffin include the Sentinel Career Center, one of two charters schools, Bridges Community Academy, and North Central Academy.

Tiffin is the home of Tiffin University, Heidelberg University, the Tiffin Academy of Hair Design, and formerly of the American Institute of Massotherapy.

Tiffin also has two Catholic churches. St. Mary's Catholic Church, originally started with primarily Irish and Italian immigrants, has a cathedral appearance and stained glass windows; it once hosted a K-8 school. St. Joseph's Catholic Church, the tallest and one of the oldest churches in Tiffin, was originally started with primarily German immigrants.

Tiffin has the county's only lending library, Tiffin-Seneca Public Library.

Media
Tiffin is served by The Advertiser-Tribune as its primary print newspaper, and TiffinOhio.net as its primary online news website. The city has 4 radio stations, 1600 WTTF AM, 103.7 WCKY-FM, 103.3 WSJG-LP "St. John Paul The Great Radio,"  and 93.3 COOL FM. It is also served by its local news/sport/entertainment channel, WTIF (Channel 21 on Cable, and currently not carried by DirecTV or Dish Network).

Infrastructure

Transportation
Tiffin has one airport, Seneca County Airport (K16G). A flex-route bus service, the Shelton Shuttle, is provided by Seneca-Crawford Area Transportation. Tiffin is currently on 5 state routes, as well as U.S. Route 224, which skirts the city's southern edge. Tiffin is located on the southern terminus of Northern Ohio and Western Railway. CSX operates a busy line that travels east and west through the city. The city is still a very busy railhub for CSX because of its closeness to CSX's Willard Yard and the "Iron Triangle" in Fostoria.

Notable people
 Oliver Edwin Baker, president of the Association of American Geographers
 George H. Brickner, politician and businessman
 Oliver Cowdery, early leader in the Latter Day Saint movement. Practiced law and politics in Tiffin, 1842–1847
 George Babcock Cressey, Geography
 Charles W. Foster, 40th Secretary of the Treasury, 35th Governor of Ohio.
 William Harvey Gibson, Union General, Civil War, and noted 19th century orator
 Lorenzo D. Gasser, U.S. Army major general
 Paul Gillmor, Republican U.S. representative representing the Ohio 5th District from 1988 to 2007.
 John R. Goodin, U.S. Representative from Kansas
 Bill Groman, professional football player in the American Football League (AFL)
 Jay Gruden, former head coach of the Washington Football Team of the NFL
 Katrina Hertzer, Chief Nurse, U. S. Navy Nurse Corps, during World War I
 Sue Wilkins Myrick, U.S. Representative from North Carolina and former mayor of Charlotte, North Carolina.
 John Quinn, Tiffin native, lawyer, art patron, collector of historical manuscripts, and major supporter of William Butler Yeats.
 George E. Seney, U.S. Representative from Ohio
 Rodger Wilton Young, Medal of Honor recipient, World War II

References

External links
 Official city website

County seats in Ohio
Cities in Seneca County, Ohio
Populated places established in 1812
Cities in Ohio
1812 establishments in Ohio